Elkhan P. Polukhov is an Azerbaijani diplomat serving as Azerbaijan Ambassador Extraordinary and Plenipotentiary to Brazil. He is also accredited in Angola and Zimbabwe.

References 

Azerbaijani diplomats
Living people
Year of birth missing (living people)
Place of birth missing (living people)